Paul A. Cameron (born May 30, 1958) is a Canadian-born American cinematographer. He is best known for his work on the film Collateral (2004), as well the HBO series Westworld.

Biography
He was born in Montreal, Canada, and raised in and around New York City. He graduated from State University of New York at Purchase.

In 2004, he won BAFTA Award for Best Cinematography and Los Angeles Film Critics Association Award for Best Cinematography with Dion Beebe on Michael Mann's Collateral.

He has been a member of the ASC since 2006.

Filmography

Film

Television

References

External links 

Paul Cameron - cinematographers.nl

1958 births
Living people
American cinematographers
Artists from Montreal
Best Cinematography BAFTA Award winners
Canadian cinematographers
Canadian emigrants to the United States